Aries is an American sounding rocket and target rocket, developed by Space Vector Corporation from retired LGM-30 Minuteman I intercontinental ballistic missile (ICBM) stages for use by the United States Air Force and NASA. Taken over by Orbital Sciences Corporation, Aries, as the Target Test Vehicle, remains in use.

Design and development
In the late 1960s, the retirement of the LGM-30 Minuteman I ICBM resulted in the opportunity to produce a high-performance sounding rocket from the surplus solid-propellant rockets that became available; the Naval Research Laboratory awarded a contract to Space Vector Corporation in 1971 to develop the "Fat Albert" rocket using the surplus Minuteman I first stages; before the first launch, the name of the rocket was changed to the "more dignified" Aries.

Aries consisted of an Aerojet M56 solid-fuel rocket, the second stage of the Minuteman I, fitted with an aerodynamic nose cone and four tail fins, taken from the RIM-8 Talos surface-to-air missile, for stabilization. Steering was by gimbaled thrust; Aries retained its guidance system, redesigned for use as a sounding rocket, allowing for more precise flight paths and use of smaller rocket ranges than other sounding rockets required; however, its size meant it required a more substantial launch platform than conventional sounding rockets.

Operational history
The first launch of Aries, carrying a dummy payload, took place on 17 October 1973; following the first two test launches, the Talos stabilizing fins were replaced by a fins of a new design, and the skirt surrounding the rocket engine nozzles was modified. Aries entered operational service, being used on over 20 flights to launch payloads such as X-ray telescopes and ultraviolet telescopes that were too heavy to be lifted by conventional sounding rockets. Payloads could be recovered using a two-stage parachute system.

In addition to its use as a sounding rocket, Aries was adapted for use as a target rocket to be used in the testing of anti-ballistic missiles. Contracted with Orbital Sciences Corporation for production in this role and designated the Target Test Vehicle (TTV), over 50 target launches had taken place, primarily testing the United States Navy's RIM-156 SM-2 Extended Range and RIM-161 Standard Missile 3 missiles; the missile remains in service.

References

Citations

Bibliography

External links

Aries at Encyclopedia Astronautica

Sounding rockets of the United States
Target missiles
Equipment of the United States Air Force